The Federal Bureau of Prisons (BOP) is a United States federal law enforcement agency under the Department of Justice that is responsible for the care, custody, and control of incarcerated individuals who have committed federal crimes; that is, violations of the United States Code.

History
The federal prison system had existed for more than 30 years before the BOP was established. Although its wardens functioned almost autonomously, the Superintendent of Prisons, a Department of Justice official in Washington, was nominally in charge of federal prisons. The passage of the "Three Prisons Act" in 1891 authorized the first three federal penitentiaries: USP Leavenworth, USP Atlanta, and USP McNeil Island with limited supervision by the Department of Justice.

Until 1907, prison matters were handled by the Justice Department General Agent, with responsibility for Justice Department accounts, oversight of internal operations, and certain criminal investigations, as well as prison operations. In 1907, the General Agent was abolished, and its functions were distributed between three new offices: the Division of Accounts (which evolved into the Justice Management Division); the Office of the Chief Examiner (which evolved in 1908 into the Bureau of Investigation, and in the early 1920s into the Federal Bureau of Investigation); and the Office of the Superintendent of Prisons and Prisoners, later called the Superintendent of Prisons (which evolved in 1930 into the Bureau of Prisons).

The Bureau of Prisons was established within the Department of Justice on May 14, 1930 by the United States Congress, and was charged with the "management and regulation of all Federal penal and correctional institutions." This responsibility covered the administration of the 11 federal prisons in operation at the time. By the end of 1930, the system had expanded to 14 institutions with 13,000 inmates, and a decade later in 1940, the system had 24 institutions with 24,360 incarcerated.

The state of Alaska assumed jurisdiction over its corrections on January 3, 1959, using the Alaska Department of Corrections; prior to statehood, the BOP had correctional jurisdiction over Alaska.

As a result of the Sentencing Reform Act of 1984 and subsequent legislation which pushed for longer sentences, less judicial discretion, and harsher sentences for drug-related offenses, the federal inmate population doubled in the 1980s and again in the 1990s. The population increase decelerated in the early 2000s, but the population continued to increase until 2014. 

The National Capital Revitalization and Self-Government Improvement Act of 1997 transferred responsibility for adult felons convicted of violating District of Columbia laws to the BOP.

Administration and employees

The current director of the Bureau of Prisons is Colette S. Peters.

As of 2020, 62.5% of Bureau employees are white, 21.3% are black, 12.6% are Hispanic, 2.3% are Asian and 1.3% are Native American. 72% are male. There is roughly one corrections officer for every 12.5 prisoners.

All BOP law enforcement employees undergo 200 hours of formal training in their first year of employment and an additional 120 hours of training at the Federal Law Enforcement Training Centers (FLETC) in Glynco, Georgia.

Past Directors

Types of federal prisons

The BOP has five security levels:

 Federal Prison Camps (FPCs), the BOP minimum-security facilities, feature a lack of or a limited amount of perimeter fencing, and a relatively low staff-to-inmate ratio.
 Low-security Federal Correctional Institutions (FCIs) have double-fenced perimeters, and inmates live in mostly cubicle or dormitory housing.
 Medium-security FCIs and some United States Penitentiaries (USPs) are classified to hold medium-security inmates. The medium facilities have strengthened perimeters, which often consist of double fences with electronic detection systems. Medium-security facilities mostly have cell housing.
 Most U.S. Penitentiaries are classified as high-security facilities. The perimeters, highly secured, often have reinforced fences or walls.
 Federal Correctional Complexes (FCCs) are co-locations of BOP facilities with different security levels and/or genders.
 Administrative Security Facilities are prisons with special missions and capabilities. An example would be Federal Medical Centers, which house sick and injured inmates getting medical care that is beyond the capabilities of a normal institution.

Some units have small, adjacent, minimum-security "satellite camps". Twenty-eight institutions hold female inmates. , about 15% of Bureau inmates are in facilities operated by third parties, mostly private companies, whilst others are in local and state facilities. Some are in privately operated Residential Reentry Centers (RRC) or Community Corrections Centers. The Bureau uses contract facilities to manage its own prison population because they are "especially useful" for housing low-security, specialized groups of people, such as sentenced criminal aliens.

Correctional officers
In the BOP, correctional officers are uniformed federal officers who protect and look after BOP prisons and inmates. The BOP has a Special Operations Response Team and Disturbance Control Team.

Inmate population

As of 2021, the Bureau was responsible for approximately 131,040 inmates, in 122 facilities. 57.9% of inmates were white, 38.2% were black, 2.5% native American, and 1.5% Asian; 93.3% were male. 30.4% were of Hispanic ethnicity, which may be any of these four races. 75% of inmates were between the ages of 26 and 50.

, 14,000 prisoners were in 16 federal prisons in the state of Texas.

, almost 8,000 felons in 90 facilities, sentenced under D.C. laws, made up about 6% of the total Bureau population.

As of August 2020, 46.2% of inmates were incarcerated for drug offenses.

The BOP receives all prisoner transfer treaty inmates sent from foreign countries, even if their crimes would have been tried in state, DC, or territorial courts if committed in the United States.

Female inmates

As of 2015, 27 Bureau facilities house women. The Bureau has a Mothers and Infants Nurturing Together (MINT) program for women who enter the system as inmates while pregnant. The Bureau pays for abortion only if it is life-threatening for the woman, but it may allow for abortions in non-life-threatening cases if non-BOP funds are used.

In 2017, four Democratic Senators, including Kamala Harris, introduced a bill explicitly requiring tampons and pads to be free for female prisoners. In August 2017, the Bureau introduced a memorandum requiring free tampons and pads. The previous 1996 memorandum stated "products for female hygiene needs shall be available" without requiring them to be free of charge.

A 2018 review by the Evaluation and Inspections Division, Office of the Inspector General, U.S. Department of Justice, found the Bureau's programming and policy decisions did not fully consider the needs of female inmates in the areas of trauma treatment programming, pregnancy programming, and feminine hygiene.

Juvenile inmates
 typically juveniles sent into Bureau custody are between 17 and 20, must have been under 18 at the time of the offense and had been convicted of sex-related offenses. This is because the most severe crimes committed on Indian Reservations are usually taken to federal court. According to the Bureau, most of the juveniles it receives had committed violent crimes and had "an unfavorable history of responding to interventions and preventive measures in the community." As of that year most federal juvenile inmates were from Arizona, Montana, South Dakota, Nebraska, and the District of Columbia (in no particular order).

The Bureau contracts with facilities that house juvenile offenders. Title 18, U.S.C. 5039 specifies that "No juvenile committed...may be placed or retained in an adult jail or correctional institution in which he has regular contact with adults incarcerated because they have been convicted of a crime or are awaiting trial on criminal charges." The definition includes secure facilities and community-based correctional facilities. Federally sentenced juveniles may be moved into federal adult facilities at certain points; juveniles sentenced as adults are moved into adult facilities when they turn 18. Juveniles sentenced as juveniles are moved into adult facilities when they turn 21.

Death row inmates

The Anti-Drug Abuse Act of 1988 reinstituted the federal death penalty. On July 19, 1993, the federal government designated the United States Penitentiary, Terre Haute in Indiana as the site of execution for both males and females sentenced to execution. The Federal Medical Center, Carswell in Texas holds the female inmates who have been sentenced to death.

Some male death row inmates are instead held at ADX Florence

As of January 16th, 2020, 49 federal inmates are on death row. Under the Trump administration, the BOP carried out 13 executions. Public health experts called for a delay in the executions, warning that they could be "superspreader" events. By February 2021, an increase of COVID-19 cases was most likely linked to BOP executions.

Overpopulation and responses
Parole was abolished for federal inmates in 1987 and inmates must serve at least 85% of their original sentence before being considered for good-behavior release. In addition, the current sentencing guidelines were adopted in response to rising crime rates in the 1980s and early 1990s, especially for drug-related offenses. Violent crime in the U.S. has dropped since then, but some analysts and activists believe that other factors played a much more significant part in falling crime rates. In addition, they hold that strict federal sentencing guidelines have led to overcrowding and needlessly incarcerated thousands of non-violent drug offenders who would be better served by drug treatment programs.

The yearly increases in the federal inmate population have raised concerns from criminal justice experts and even among DOJ officials themselves. Michael Horowitz, the DOJ Inspector General, wrote a memorandum concerning this issue:

COVID-19 pandemic
By July 30, 2020, there were 2,910 federal inmates and 500 BOP staff who had confirmed positive test results for COVID-19 during the nationwide COVID-19 pandemic. 7312 inmates and 683 staff have recovered. There have been 99 federal inmate deaths and two BOP staff member deaths attributed to COVID-19.

The BOP conducted executions during the pandemic that reportedly did not adhere to physical distancing rules, leading to criticism that the BOP was facilitating "superspreader" events. Staff reportedly refused to wear face masks, a violation of court orders, and knowingly withheld information about confirmed COVID-19 diagnoses from people who had interacted with infected individuals along with hindering contact tracing efforts and allowing staff members who had been exposed to COVID-19 to refuse testing and work. Public health experts called for a delay in executions, as they could not be carried out safely without risking the spread of COVID-19.

See also 

 Federal crime in the United States
 List of U.S. federal prisons
 List of United States federal law enforcement agencies
 National Institute of Corrections
 Federal Prison Industries, Inc. (UNICOR)

References

 Arons, Anna, Katherine Culver, Emma Kaufman, Jennifer Yun, Hope Metcalf, Megan Quattlebaum, and Judith Resnik. "Dislocation and Relocation: Women in the Federal Prison System and Repurposing FCI Danbury for Men." Yale Law School, Arthur Liman Public Interest Program. September 2014.

Further reading 
The Federal Prison Population Buildup: Overview, Policy Changes, Issues, and Options, Congressional Research Service
Atlanta Federal Penitentiary Inmate Case Files, 1902–1921 at the National Archives at Atlanta

External links 

 
 Federal Bureau of Prisons in the Federal Register
 Federal Bureau of Prisons Inmate Locator

 
Prisons in the United States
Prison and correctional agencies
United States Department of Justice agencies
Penal system in the United States
Government agencies established in 1930
1930 establishments in the United States
United States